= Kiala =

- Location within Pakistan
- Coordinates: 34.02°N 73.15°E
- Country: Pakistan
- Province: Khyber-Pakhtunkhwa
- Elevation: 1,267 m (4,157 ft)
- Time zone: UTC+5 (PST)

Kiala is a village in Khyber-Pakhtunkhwa province of Pakistan. It is located at 34°2'0N 73°15'0E with an altitude of 1267 metres (4160 feet).
